Iavnana is a 1994 Georgian film directed by Nana Janelidze. The plot concerns the relationship between two parents and their daughter, who suffers from amnesia after a long separation.

Awards 
 Georgian State Prize
 Iakob Gogebashvili Educational Prize

See also 
 Iavnana
 List of Georgian films of the 1990s

References

External links 
 

1994 films
Drama films from Georgia (country)